Elliott R. Brown from the University of California, Los Angeles, was awarded the status of Fellow in the American Physical Society, after they were nominated by their Forum on Industrial and Applied Physics  in 2007, for breakthroughs in THz science and technology including new solid-state coherent sources: (1) resonant-tunneling oscillators, and (2) photomixers; new detectors based on single-crystal, semimetal-semiconductor junctions; and high-resolution spectroscopy of solids.

References 

Fellows of the American Physical Society
American physicists
Living people
Year of birth missing (living people)